Pordašinci is a roadside village in the Municipality of Moravske Toplice in the Prekmurje region of Slovenia, close to the border with Hungary.

There is a wooden belfry in the centre of the village. It was erected in 1926.

References

External links
Pordašinci on Geopedia

Populated places in the Municipality of Moravske Toplice